Brigada Specială de Intervenție a Jandarmeriei (Gendarmerie Special Intervention Brigade, BSIJ) is a  special operations force belonging to the Romanian Gendarmerie. The unit carries the name "Vlad Țepeș" after the legendary Wallachian ruler, Vlad the Impaler.

Organization

The Brigade is divided into four units:

 COMANDAMENT (COMMAND) - The structure that ensures the organization, command, control and coordination of the fulfillment of the attributions that fall within the competence of the Special Intervention Brigade of the Gendarmerie. It consists of the General Staff as a flexible, dynamic and mobile structure designed for the integrated operational coordination in the field of forces and logistical financial support structures to ensure the material, technical and financial support of the operational structures.
  Batalionul 1 Jandarmi Special Intervenție Antiteroristă, Acțiuni Speciale și Protecție (1st Gendarmes Battalion Special Counterterrorism Intervention, Special Actions and Protection) - It is the operative structure within the Special Gendarmerie Intervention Brigade consisting of specialized military personnel, with special physical, psychological and technical skills, trained, to the highest standards, to intervene in a timely and effective manner in any environment (land, air, water) for fulfilling specific missions with a high degree of risk (counterterrorism intervention, special actions, preventing and combating acts of terrorism).
  Batalionul 2 Jandarmi Special Intervenție (2nd Gendarmes Battalion Special Intervention) - It is the operative structure of the Special Gendarmerie Intervention Brigade specialized in crisis management in the field of public order, ensuring public order and peace during the visits of official delegations and dignitaries, Romanians and foreigners, ensuring public order and peace during public events with high risk , in which a large public participates, the rescue-evacuation of persons, the intervention for the restoration of public order in case it has been seriously disturbed and Riot police.
Batalionul 3 Jandarmi Special de Intervenție, Acțiuni Speciale și Protecție (3rd Battalion Special Intervention, Special Actions and Protection Gendarmes) - As a result of the high dynamics of the missions entrusted to the Special Brigade, the need arose for a structural projection that would meet the operational needs. In this context, in 2019, the 3rd Special Gendarmes Battalion for Intervention, Special Actions and Protection was created.  The selection of specialists for the 3rd Battalion Special Gendarmes for Intervention, Special Actions and Protection is a very rigorous one and includes elements that can test the upper limits of the fighters, from a physical and mental point of view. The further training of the fighters is one focused on the execution of the main categories of missions and specialization in the pyrotechnic and sniper fields, specific to the unit.  Battalion 3 fighters are trained to act punctually, in small teams, with a high level of operational autonomy, in missions with a high degree of complexity.  The equipment and armament of the 3rd Battalion are adapted to the missions performed and meant to confer a high response capacity.

Equipment 

The Special Intervention Brigade is equipped with the following:

Firearms

Armored Vehicles
AM 7.0 M - armored anti-riot vehicle
Oshkosh Plasan SandCat - light armored vehicle

References

External links
 
  
  Unofficial website

ATLAS Network
Gendarmerie (Romania)
Police tactical units
Special forces of Romania